Dilution of precision may refer to:

 Dilution of precision (navigation), a term used in geomatics engineering to describe the geometric strength of satellite configuration
 Dilution of precision (computer graphics), an algorithmic trick used to handle difficult problems in hidden line removal